The SkiArena Andermatt-Sedrun (previously the Gotthard Oberalp Arena and the Gotthard Oberalp Skiarena (until 2013)) is a ski area located in Andermatt, Sedrun, and Oberalp in Switzerland. It has 16 ski lifts and approximately 30 runs, and just over 100 km of pistes. The ski area covers five separate mountains:
 Gemsstock
 Nätschen
 Sedrun / Oberalp
 Realp (small beginner slope only)
 Valtgeva (small beginner slope only)

It previously included Winterhorn, in Hospental, which was abandoned in 2007.

Train services (run by the Matterhorn Gotthard Bahn) are vital in this resort as they are the only means of transport available to travel from Andermatt (Nätschen and Gemsstock) to Oberalp, Dieni, and Sedrun. Between Andermatt, Hospental, and Realp can be journeyed by car as well as the railway.

Ski areas

Gemsstock 

Gemsstock is located south of Andermatt. It has 7 runs (31 km of pistes) and 4 ski lifts.  Gemsstock is suitable for a range of skiers of all abilities, but in particular those who are more advanced.

Nätschen 

 Nätschen is one of the three main mountains making the ski area. It has 24 runs (39 km of pistes) and 5 lifts, and is located north of Andermatt. Nätschen is a mountain more suited for beginners. There is also a skiing area for children, served by two magic carpets. In 2017 and 2018, new lifts were constructed, creating a connection between Nätschen and Oberalp. 

Nätschen generally closes early for the summer, as it is south facing and is quite low.

Sedrun / Oberalp 

Sedrun / Oberalp is located near Dieni, and is the biggest of all of the three mountains' ski areas. It is good for skiers and snowboarders of all levels. It has 7 ski lifts and has 13 pistes (50 km of pistes). There is a large terrain park, a half pipe, and a ski cross course.

Realp 

In Realp there is a single, small T-bar, and a beginner run. There is also cross-country skiing nearby, and a biathlon course. Access can be made here by railway or by car (from Andermatt only).

Valtgeva 

In Sedrun there are two small beginner runs, served by two T-bars and a magic carpet.

Winterhorn 

In Hospental, there is a mountain called Winterhorn, which has been disused since 2007. The 2-man chairlift and the T-bar remain in place. The mountain was generally suited to intermediate skiers. It was accessible by either railway or car (from Andermatt only).

Ski lifts

Operational 

There are in total 19 operating ski lifts in the SkiArena Andermatt-Sedrun.

Former 

There are currently four disused, but still standing, ski lifts in the SkiArena Andermatt-Sedrun.

Ski schools 

The SkiArena Andermatt-Sedrun has four schools; one for the Sedrun skiing area, and three for the Andermatt ski areas. Each have several different classes, based on age and ability.

Future 

Plans are underway to replace the majority of the current ski lifts in Andermatt, along with new lifts and routes. The plans are for
 A new detachable 4-man chairlift replacing the current T-bar Lutersee - Geissgrat
 A new cable car providing access from Göschenen
 A new 8-man gondola lift replacing the current Cable car Andermatt - Gurschen

See also 

 Gemsstock
 Nätschen
 Sedrun
 Andermatt
 Oberalp
 Realp
 Hospental

References 

Ski areas in Switzerland
Andermatt
Tourist attractions in the canton of Uri
Buildings and structures in the canton of Uri